Elizabeth Whitmere is a Canadian actress working in the United States and Canada.  Born and raised in northern Canada, she draws on her experiences there in the development of her characters and her stand-up comedy.

Whitmere appeared in her first play as a child, and spent her high school years training at Walnut Hill School, a performing arts boarding school in Natick, Massachusetts.  After working in Montreal for some years, Wetmore moved her base of operations to Toronto in 2004.  She now divides her time between Toronto and Los Angeles.

Personal life
On August 20, 2005, she married Terry McGurrin, the star of Comedy Inc., a comedy show Whitmere once wrote for.

Filmography

Film

Television

References

External links

MySpace page
photos from episode Hollywood Babylon of "supernatural"

Canadian film actresses
Canadian television actresses
Living people
Year of birth missing (living people)